A bet is a gambling wager. 

Bet or BET may also refer to:

Arts and entertainment
 Bet Lynch, a fictional character from the British ITV soap opera Coronation Street
 Elizabeth "Bet" Yeager, protagonist of Rimrunners, a science fiction novel
 the title character of Bet, Queen of Jordan, a 1924 Dutch film
"Bet" (song), a 2019 song by Octavian
"Bet", a song from Aquarius, a 2014 Tinashe album

Business and economics
 BET, Black Entertainment Television, an American television channel
 Budapest Stock Exchange (in Hungarian Budapesti Értéktőzsde (BÉT))
 BET plc, formerly British Electric Traction
 Biotechnia Ellinikon Trikyklon, a Greek vehicle manufacturer that ceased production in 1975
 Basic Economics Test

Places
 Borkou-Ennedi-Tibesti (prefecture), a former prefecture of Chad
 Borkou-Ennedi-Tibesti (region), a former region of Chad

People
 Bet van Beeren (1902—1967), legendary bar owner in Amsterdam
 Bet Low (1924–2007), Scottish painter
 Aldo Bet (born 1949), Italian former footballer
 Yelena Bet (born 1976), Belarusian sprint canoer

Science
 BET theory, an adsorption model for gases named after physicists Brunauer, Emmett and Teller
 Blade element theory to determine the behaviour of propellers
 Bromo- and Extra-Terminal domain (BET) family of Bromodomain-containing proteins

Other uses
 Bet (letter), the second letter in many Semitic alphabets, including Phoenician, Hebrew, Syriac, and Arabic
 BET Awards, established in 2001 by Black Entertainment Television 
 BET, IATA code for Bethel Airport, Alaska
 BET, National Rail station code for Bethnal Green railway station, London

See also
 Bayt (disambiguation)Bayt/Beit/Beth/Bet (disambiguation), meaning 'house' in various Semitic languages; part of many place-names
 Bet Bet Creek, Victoria, Australia
 Beth (disambiguation)
 Bets (disambiguation)
 Betty (disambiguation)
 Elizabeth (disambiguation)
 Old Bet (died 1816), the first circus elephant and the second elephant brought to the United States
 Shire of Bet Bet, Victoria, Australia, a local government area
 The Bet (disambiguation)